Woman Times Seven is a 1967 sex comedy anthology film directed by Vittorio De Sica. It consists of seven segments, all starring Shirley MacLaine, most of which deal with aspects of adultery.

Plot

Paulette/Funeral Procession
Leading a walking funeral procession behind the hearse containing the remains of her late husband, a widow is propositioned by her family doctor, played by Peter Sellers. Vittorio De Sica has a cameo as one of the mourners.

Maria Teresa/Amateur Night
Surprised at finding her husband in bed with her best friend, a shocked wife vows revenge by planning to have sex with the first man whom she sees. She meets a group of prostitutes who try to help her achieve her goal. A prostitute gives a client to her; but, she quickly gets out of his car, shocked by the client's nudity. The prostitute then has her boyfriend give Maria Teresa a ride home. On their arrival, they meet her husband looking for her in the street. The husband insults the boyfriend, who responds by socking him in the face. The receipt of the blow earns Marie Teresa's sympathy.

Linda/Two Against One
Linda is a translator working at an airport, greeting Japanese tourists.

At a party a Scotsman and an Italian are invited to her room where she reads T. S. Eliot in the nude and starts bouncing on the bed. They all three sit on the bed and watch her slide show of art works. The men have a slap fight whilst the photo of her lover in military uniform looks on sternly from a shelf. She throws the picture out and moves to seduce both.

Edith/Super Simone
Edith goes shyly into her husband Rik's study, where he is smoking his pipe with his Great Dane by his side, he reads his latest chapter about his fictional creation: Simone.

Rik details his romantic fantasies but these are for Simone not Edith. They go to a bistro but he prefers writing to chatting. He has forgotten it is their anniversary. He  asks if she would like ice cream but she demands champagne. The next day she starts acting oddly, singing instead of talking. In the evening she answers the door in a tiny pink negligee which she wears at the dinner table. The maid looks on in disbelief. She was hired a muscular black man to serve dinner.

The next evening her shocked husband invites Dr Xavier, a psychiatrist to the house to examine her for mental illness. She escapes onto the rooftops. As her husband scoops her up, she states in exasperation, "I'm not crazy, I'm in love."

Eve/At the Opera
Eve, a fashion diva, is horrified when her arch-rival Mme Lisari is photographed in what her husband had promised was an exclusive creation for her alone. The article mentions that Mme Lisari intends to debut the dress at the opera that night.

Eve calls Mme Lisari and asks she alter the dress in some small way, a request which Mme Lisari denies.

Furious, Eve enlists the aid of her husband's company. The head of research and development at her husband's fashion house suggests planting a small bomb in Mme Lisari's car. Her husband is not happy with the plan but nevertheless goes ahead with it. They witness the sabotage and Mme Lisari's driveway and go on to the opera house.

Eve makes a grand entrance at the Palais Garnier. Her glory reaches a shinning moment when the audience stand and gaze at her in her box; this moment is ruined when another, older woman, comes into her own box wears the same dress.

Eve is desolate and runs out of the box crying. While sobbing on the stairs, her sorrow is allayed when she sees Mme Lisari arriving, her version of the dress in tatters from the bomb blast.

Louis Alexandre Raimon has a cameo as himself.

Marie/The Suicides
On the sixth floor of a narrow corner block in Paris, two lovers, Marie and Fred, feel rejected by the world, and sit in a bedroom full of graffiti in a garret. Marie makes a tape recording of their plan to be given to her husband. Fred makes a parallel recording for his wife, Juliet. They decide to commit suicide in their small room, dressed for the wedding that they will never have. But Fred is afraid of pills, does not want to mess up his tuxedo by jumping out of the window and cannot trust his lover to shoot him. After they face their planned suicide more seriously, Fred packs his suitcase to leave only to find Marie has broken out of the bathroom window and has run down the fire escape.

Jeanne/Snow
Two friends Jeanne and Claudie walk along a wide Parisien avenue on a winter afternoon. They notice a handsome but seedy-looking man who appears to be following them. He physically bumps into hem. Claudie suggests that the two go for lunch in a bistro. He follows them in then leaves but hangs around outside. They leave the bistro and go their separate ways to see which one he follows. He takes a while to choose. As the city is hit by a sudden blizzard, Jeanne realizes that the man is following her when she sees him on the opposite side lurking behind a lorry. A shopowner thinks she is looking in his shop and she goes into the tool shop and leaves with an electric drill. She gets on a tram and he joins but gets blocked by the crowd when she gets off.

She goes home to her husband Victor and gives him the drill. She looks out of the window, Her admirer is sitting in the snow on a bench in the park. The man phones the flat from a call box and has an odd conversation with Victor then walks off leaving only his footprints.

Cast

"Funeral Procession" 
 Shirley MacLaine as Paulette 
 Peter Sellers as Jean
 Elspeth March as Annette
 Vittorio De Sica as Mourner (uncredited)

"Amateur Night"
 Shirley MacLaine as Maria Teresa 
 Rossano Brazzi as Giorgio
 Judith Magre as Bitter Thirty
 Catherine Samie as Jeannine
 Laurence Badie as Prostitute
 Zanie Campan as Prostitute
 Robert Duranton as Didi

"Two Against One"
 Shirley MacLaine as Linda
 Vittorio Gassman as Cenci
 Clinton Greyn as MacCormack

"Super Simone"
 Shirley MacLaine as Edith
 Lex Barker as Rik
 Elsa Martinelli as Pretty Woman
 Robert Morley as Dr. Xavier
 Jessie Robins as Marianne, Edith's Maid

"At the Opera"
 Shirley MacLaine as Eve Minou
 Patrick Wymark as Henri Minou her husband
 Michael Brennan as Mr. Lisiere
 Adrienne Corri as Mme. Lisiere
 Jacques Ciron as Féval (uncredited)
 Roger Lumont as Nossereau (uncredited)
 Roger Trapp as Crosnier (uncredited)

"The Suicides"
 Shirley MacLaine as Marie
 Alan Arkin as Fred

"Snow"
 Shirley MacLaine as Jeanne
 Michael Caine as Handsome Stranger
 Anita Ekberg as Claudie
 Philippe Noiret as Victor
 Georges Adet as Old Man (uncredited)
 Jacques Legras as Salesman (uncredited)

Production
Woman Times Seven was the first of what was intended to be three films made by Joseph E. Levine, producer Arthur Cohn and Vittorio De Sica working together. As Levine and De Sica had critical and financial success with the films Yesterday, Today and Tomorrow (1963) and Marriage Italian Style (1964), Levine asked De Sica for a similar film, and De Sica used some sketches made by his collaborator Cesare Zavattini as the basis. The first choice for the lead role, Natalie Wood, declined the role.

The concepts of adultery in the film have a European flavor. For example, Vittorio Gassman's character reminds Clinton Greyn's character that divorce is, at the time of filming, impossible for an Italian.

The film was shot in Paris. Wardrobe was supplied by Pierre Cardin, jewelry by Van Cleef & Arpels, furs by Henri Stern and hairdressing by Louis Alexandre Raimon.

Lord Lucan, later to be suspected of murder, unsuccessfully screen-tested for a role in the film. After that failure, he declined an invitation from Albert R. Broccoli to audition for the part of James Bond.

Reception
In a contemporary review for The New York Times, critic Bosley Crowther harshly denounced the film: "For a man who has treated women as nicely as Vittorio De Sica has—as witness the several classic characters he has created with Sophia Loren—it is shocking and thoroughly bewildering to find him kicking them around as he does in his new picture ... Not one of the seven silly females whom Shirley MacLaine portrays in this series of seven blackout sketches provokes any feeling but disgust—or possibly embarrassment and pity—for the weaker (shall we say minded?) sex. Not one of them has the charm, the humor or the vitality we've come to expect in Mr. De Sica's women. And not one of them shows a spark of truth."

Variety wrote: "Woman Times Seven means a seven-segment showcase for the talents of Shirley MacLaine, playing in tragicomedy and dramatic fashion a variety of femme types. MacLaine is spotted in many different adult situations, and largely convinces with each switcheroo."

Box office
According to Fox records, the film needed to earn $2,975,000 in rentals to break even and made $1,100,000, meaning it made a loss.

References

External links
 
 
 
 
 

1967 films
1967 comedy-drama films
1960s English-language films
1960s sex comedy films
Adultery in films
American anthology films
American comedy-drama films
American sex comedy films
Commedia sexy all'italiana
English-language French films
English-language Italian films
Films directed by Vittorio De Sica
Films scored by Riz Ortolani
Films set in Paris
Films with screenplays by Cesare Zavattini
French anthology films
French comedy-drama films
French sex comedy films
Italian anthology films
Italian comedy-drama films
1960s American films
1960s Italian films
1960s French films